Ontoella is an extinct genus of trilobite in the class Trilobita. There is at least one described species in Ontoella, O. triangulata.

References

Trilobites
Articles created by Qbugbot